Randolph High School is a public high school in Randolph, Wisconsin, United States.

Athletics
The Randolph Rockets compete in the Trailways Conference. School colors are royal blue and white. The following Wisconsin Interscholastic Athletic Association (WIAA) sanctioned sports are offered:

Baseball (boys) 
Basketball (girls and boys) 
Boys state champion - 1996, 1998, 2002, 2003, 3004, 2005, 2007, 2010, 2011, 2013, 2022
Cross country (girls and boys) 
Football (boys) 
Golf (boys) 
Softball (girls)
Track and field (girls and boys) 
Volleyball (girls)

Notable alumni
 Greg Stiemsma, National Basketball Association (NBA) basketball player
 David Hookstead, conservative sports commentator at Fox News' Outkick and the host of American Joyride

References

External links

Schools in Dodge County, Wisconsin
Public high schools in Wisconsin